Architecture and Vision (AV) is an international multidisciplinary design agency that was formed in 2003 by Arturo Vittori in partnership with Andreas Volger. AV works in architecture, design, and art. 

The practice specializes in technology transfer between disciplines such as aerospace, art, and architecture.

History
Architecture and Vision was established in 2003 and is directed by architect Arturo Vittori, based in Bomarzo Viterbo, Italy,  and Andreas Vogler, based in Munich, Germany.

Projects 
2014: WarkaWater 2.0, USEK, Beirut, Lebanon
2013: OR of the Future, UIC, Chicago, United States
2012: WarkaWater, Venice Biennale, Venice, Italy
2011: LaFenice, Messina, Sicily, Italy
2011: AtlasCoelestisZeroG, International Space Station
2011: Corsair International, Paris, France
2009: AtlasCoelestis, Sullivan Galleries, Chicago, Illinois
2009: MercuryHouseOne, Venice Biennale, Venice, Italy
2009: FioredelCielo, Macchina di Santa Rosa, Viterbo, Italy
2007: BirdHouse, Bird House Foundation, Osaka, Japan
2006: DesertSeal, permanent collection, Museum of Modern Art (MOMA), New York City

Awards and recognition
Several projects designed by Architecture and Vision have received international recognition. 

In 2006, a prototype of the extreme environment tent, "DesertSeal" (2004), became part of the permanent collection of the Museum of Modern Art, New York, after being featured in SAFE: Design Takes on Risk (2005), curated by Paola Antonelli. In the same year, Chicago's Museum of Science and Industry selected Vittori and Vogler as "Modern-day Leonardos" for its Leonardo da Vinci: Man, Inventor, Genius exhibition. 

In 2007, a model of the inflatable habitat "MoonBaseTwo" (2007), developed to allow long-term exploration on the Moon, was acquired for the collection of the Museum of Science and Industry, while "MarsCruiserOne" (2007), the design for a pressurized laboratory rover for the exploration of Mars, was shown at the Centre Georges Pompidou, Paris, as part of the exhibition Airs de Paris (2007).

References

Further reading
 Paola Antonelli (ed.), Safe: Design Takes on Risk, The Museum of Modern Art, New York 2005, p. 64. 
 Valérie Guillaume, "architecture + vision. Mars Cruiser One 2002-2006", in Airs de Paris,  Diffusion Union-Distribution, Paris 2007, pp. 338–339. 
 Namita Goel, The Beauty of the Extreme, Indian Architect & Builder, March 2006, pp. 82–83.
 Arturo Vittori, Architecture and Vision, in L'Arca, October 2004, 196, pp. 26–38.
 Un veicolo per Marte. Mars Cruiser One, in L'Arca, April 2007, 224, p. 91.
 Ruth Slavid, Micro: Very Small Buildings, Laurence King Publishing, London, pp. 102–106, 
 Wüstenzelt Desert Seal / Desert Seal Tent, in Detail, 2008, 6, pp. 612–614

External links 
 Official website

Design companies of Italy
Design companies of Germany
Aerospace
Architecture groups
Design companies established in 2003
Italian companies established in 2003
German companies established in 2003